Dařbuján a Pandrhola is a 1960 Czech fantasy film directed by Martin Frič.

Cast
 Jiří Sovák as Kuba Darbuján
 Rudolf Hrušínský as Pandrhola
 Václav Lohniský as Smrták
 Josef Hlinomaz as Basta

References

External links
 

1960 films
Czech fantasy films
Czechoslovak fantasy films
1960s Czech-language films
Films directed by Martin Frič
1960s fantasy films
Films based on fairy tales
1960s Czech films